Clyma est mort is a live album by The Dead C, released in 1992 through Siltbreeze. It was recorded in front of an audience of one. The album's title is in reference to the band's recently deceased cat, and the cover references The Fall's Totale's Turns. Mary-Rose Crook of the Renderers introduces one song. The cover for the first edition of the LP was made from recycled copies of the Harsh 70s Reality sleeve.

Track listing

Personnel 
The Dead C – production
Michael Morley – instruments
Bruce Russell – instruments
Robbie Yeats – instruments

References

External links 
 

1992 live albums
The Dead C albums